The DBL Arena is an indoor sporting arena located in Surabaya, East Java, Indonesia. Located in the suburb of Surabaya, adjacent to the Graha Pena Building, it is renowned as one of the Indonesia's main venue for basketball matches. It is also home for the Development Basketball League, a basketball competition between junior and senior high schools formerly named DetEksi Basketball League (DBL). It is owned by Jawa Pos Group, and operated by DBL Indonesia.

See also
 List of indoor arenas
 Mata Elang International Stadium
 Istora Gelora Bung Karno
 The BritAma Arena
 Palembang Sport and Convention Center

References

External links

 DBL Arena website

Indoor arenas in Indonesia
Sports venues in Surabaya
Basketball venues in Indonesia
Sports venues completed in 2008
2008 establishments in Indonesia